USS De Wert (FFG-45), an , was a ship of the United States Navy. She was named for Hospitalman Richard De Wert (1931–1951). De Wert posthumously received the Medal of Honor for his heroism while serving with the 7th Marines during the Korean War.

De Wert was laid down on 14 June 1982 by the Bath Iron Works, in Bath, Maine; launched on 18 December 1982, sponsored by Reta C. Kennedy; and commissioned on 19 November 1983 at Bath, Commander Douglas Armstrong in command.

Commander Destroyer Squadron Six conducted a Command Administration Inspection 24–26 August 1985. The ship got underway with an air detachment embarked 13 August through 7 September to participate in a Readiness Exercise (READEX 3-85), along with fifteen surface ships, two (2) submarines of the United States Atlantic Fleet and one unit of the Royal Netherlands Navy.

The ship got underway on 2 October for its first major overseas deployment. De Wert joined the Sixth Fleet on 14 October and participated in Operation Display Determination 85, under the command of Commander Task Force 60 with 2 carriers, 16 warships, and 130 aircraft of the Sixth Fleet. This exercise proved to be predominantly an anti-aircraft and anti-submarine warfare exercise.

On 16 February 2007, De Wert was awarded the 2006 Battle "E" award.

On 23 May 2008, De Wert departed her homeport at Naval Station Mayport, Florida, for a counter-drug deployment to the Eastern Pacific Ocean.  During that deployment she made port visits at Roatán Island, Honduras; Panamá City, Panamá; Salaverry, Perú; Panamá City, Panamá; Curaçao, Netherlands Antilles; and Key West, Florida.  She returned to homeport on 6 October 2008.

In 2011, De Wert was awarded the 2010 Battle "E" award, having earned all command excellence awards in calendar year 2010.

On 11 October 2011, De Wert, along with the British Royal Fleet Auxiliary vessel RFA Fort Victoria, rescued the Italian vessel Montecristo after it was boarded by Somali pirates, while on joint anti-piracy operations in the Indian Ocean.

De Wert was decommissioned on 4 April 2014.

About De Wert's coat of arms:  The crest commemorates Richard De Wert's conspicuous gallantry, for which he was awarded the Medal of Honor, represented by the reversed light blue star. The four rays, for hope, represent the four times De Wert courageously exposed himself to enemy fire to save his wounded shipmates. The small stars represent valor; the sprigs of oak, strength. The ship's motto "Daring, Dauntless, Defiant" expresses the courageous sacrifice of De Wert, and serves as an inspiration to the men who man the warship named in his honor.  The shield's dark blue and gold are the colors of the Navy. The scarlet cross, edged in gold, represents De Wert's service as a Hospitalman with the U.S. Marine Corps. The anchor and globe are adapted from the Marine Corps emblem, and also symbolize the world-wide mission of the ship.  The taeguk superimposed thereon denotes De Wert's service in Korea, where he gave his life.

References

External links 

 
  navysite.de: USS De Wert
 MaritimeQuest USS DeWert (FFG-45) pages

 2008 Deployment 

 

1982 ships
Oliver Hazard Perry-class frigates of the United States Navy
Ships built in Bath, Maine